Fighting Bill Fargo is a 1941 American Western film directed by Ray Taylor and written by Paul Franklin, Arthur V. Jones and Dorcas Cochran. The film stars Johnny Mack Brown, Fuzzy Knight, Jean Brooks, Kenneth Harlan, Nell O'Day and Ted Adams. The film was released on December 9, 1941, by Universal Pictures.

Plot

Cast         
Johnny Mack Brown as Bill Fargo
Fuzzy Knight as Scoop
Jean Brooks as Linda Tyler 
Kenneth Harlan as Hackett
Nell O'Day as Julie Fargo
Ted Adams as Vic Savage
James Blaine as Cash Scanlon
Alan Bridge as Tom Houston

References

External links
 

1941 films
American Western (genre) films
1941 Western (genre) films
Universal Pictures films
Films directed by Ray Taylor
American black-and-white films
1940s English-language films
1940s American films